The 2013 ICC World Cricket League Division Six was a cricket tournament that took place from 21 to 28 July 2013. It formed part of the ICC World Cricket League and qualifying for the 2019 Cricket World Cup.

Jersey hosted the event.

Teams
The teams that took part in the tournament were decided according to the results of the 2011 ICC World Cricket League Division Six, the 2012 ICC World Cricket League Division Five and the 2013 ICC World Cricket League Division Seven.

Squads

Points table

Fixtures

Final and Playoffs
The playoff matches were cancelled after the abandonment of fifth-round group matches led to replays on the day the playoff matches were scheduled.

Statistics

Most runs
The top five highest run scorers (total runs) are included in this table.

Most wickets
The following table contains the five leading wicket-takers.

Final Placings

After the conclusion of the tournament the teams were distributed as follows:

References

https://web.archive.org/web/20120406115546/http://icc-cricket.yahoo.net/newsdetails.php?newsId=13910_1302162060

2013, 6
2013 in cricket
International cricket competitions in Jersey
2013 in Jersey